The 1947 Masters Tournament was the 11th Masters Tournament, held April 3–6 at Augusta National Golf Club in Augusta, Georgia. The purse was $10,000 with a winner's share of $2,500.

Jimmy Demaret, the 1940 champion, was the co-leader after both the first and second rounds, and had a three-shot lead after 54 holes. He carded a 71 on Sunday and won by two strokes over Byron Nelson and amateur Frank Stranahan. Demaret joined Horton Smith and Nelson as two-time winners of the Masters. He was the first to score four sub-par rounds in the same Masters and later became the first three-time winner in 1950.

Field
1. Masters champions
Jimmy Demaret (9,10,12), Herman Keiser (9), Byron Nelson (2,6,9,10,12), Henry Picard (6,10), Gene Sarazen (2,4,6), Horton Smith (9), Craig Wood (2)
Ralph Guldahl (2) did not play.

2. U.S. Open champions
Billy Burke, Johnny Farrell, Bobby Jones (3,4,5), Lawson Little (3,5,9,10), Lloyd Mangrum (9,10)

3. U.S. Amateur champions
Dick Chapman (8,a)

4. British Open champions
Denny Shute (6), Sam Snead (6,9,10)

5. British Amateur champions
Charlie Yates (a)

6. PGA champions
Vic Ghezzi (9,10), Bob Hamilton (9), Ben Hogan (9,10,12), Johnny Revolta

7. Members of the U.S. 1947 Ryder Cup team
Team not selected in time for inclusion.

8. Members of the U.S. 1947 Walker Cup team
George Hamer (a), Skee Riegel (a), Frank Stranahan (9,a)

Ted Bishop (3,11,a), Fred Kammer (11,a), Smiley Quick (11,a), Willie Turnesa (3,5,a) and Bud Ward (3,a) did not play.

9. Top 24 players and ties from the 1946 Masters Tournament
Johnny Bulla (10), Jim Ferrier, Jim Foulis, Fred Haas, Chick Harbert (10), Claude Harmon (10), Chandler Harper (10), Clayton Heafner (10), Ky Laffoon, Cary Middlecoff (11), Toney Penna (10), George Schneiter, Felix Serafin

10. Top 24 players and ties from the 1946 U.S. Open
Herman Barron, Ed Furgol, Dutch Harrison, Steve Kovach, Gene Kunes, Dick Metz, Ed Oliver (12), Harry Todd, Lew Worsham

Henry Ransom and Paul Runyan did not play.

11. 1946 U.S. Amateur quarter-finalists
Babe Lind (a), Robert Willits (a)

Maurice McCarthy (8,a) and Robert Sweeny Jr. (5,a) did not play.

12. 1946 PGA Championship quarter-finalists
Charles Congdon, Jug McSpaden, Frank Moore, Jim Turnesa

13. One amateur, not already qualified, selected by a ballot of ex-U.S. Amateur champions
Johnny Dawson (a) did not play

14. One professional, not already qualified, selected by a ballot of ex-U.S. Open champions
Ellsworth Vines

15. Two players, not already qualified, with the best scoring average in the winter part of the 1947 PGA Tour
Johnny Palmer, George Schoux

16 Winner of the 1947 Inter-service Invitational tournament
Joe MacDonald (a)

17 Home club professional
Ed Dudley

18. Extra invitations
George Fazio (winner of the 1946 Canadian Open), Bobby Locke

Round summaries

First round
Thursday, April 3, 1947

Source:

Second round
Friday, April 4, 1947

Source:

Third round
Saturday, April 5, 1947

Source:

Final round
Sunday, April 6, 1947

Final leaderboard

Sources:

Scorecard

Cumulative tournament scores, relative to par

References

External links
Masters.com – past winners and results
Augusta.com – 1947 Masters leaderboard and scorecards

1947
1947 in golf
1947 in American sports
1947 in sports in Georgia (U.S. state)
April 1947 sports events in the United States